Many television shows are filmed in Atlanta, set in Atlanta, or both:

Shot and/or set in metro Atlanta (partial list)
All American: Homecoming
Atlanta
Archer
Big Rich Atlanta on Style Network
Black Lightning, produced by The CW and aired on January 16, 2018
Class of 3000 on Cartoon Network
Chrisley Knows Best
Containment, produced by The CW and aired from April 19 through July 19, 2016
Devious Maids (set in Beverly Hills but filmed primarily at EUE Screen Gems in Atlanta)
Don't Be Tardy
Drop Dead Diva (set in Los Angeles but actually filmed around Peachtree City and Senoia)
Dynasty, 2017 continuation on CW of the 1980s series, with the story moved, and shot, in Atlanta.
Family Feud 2011-2012 season was recorded at the Atlanta Civic Center (host Steve Harvey is a local resident) 
For Better or Worse, produced by Tyler Perry Studios
Franklin & Bash, a Williams Street production
Freaknik: The Musical, a Williams Street production
Good Eats, hosted by local resident Alton Brown
Halt and Catch Fire, set in the Dallas-Fort Worth Metroplex but actually filmed in Atlanta
K. Michelle: My Life
Kenan
Let's Stay Together
Love & Hip Hop: Atlanta
Love, Victor
 Married to Medicine, documents the wives of doctors in Atlanta
Mean Girls 2 was filmed in Atlanta in July 2010
Meet the Browns, produced by Tyler Perry Studios
Necessary Roughness (Set in Long Island but filmed in Atlanta, with football scenes filmed in the Georgia Dome)
Ocean Mysteries with Jeff Corwin - Saturday morning nature show with Jeff Corwin airing on ABC
One Punk Under God (documentary)
Ozark, Netflix series, Lake Allatoona and Lake Lanier
Property Virgins on HGTV, with host Egypt Sherrod of V-103 (earlier seasons were from HGTV Canada)
Queer Eye on Netflix (Seasons 1 and 2)
Raising Dion on Netflix
Red Band Society on FOX
The Resident
Say Yes to the Dress: Atlanta, in Sandy Springs
Say Yes to the Dress: Bridesmaids
Second Generation Wayans, on BET
Stranger Things, set in Indiana but shot in Atlanta, Georgia
T.I. & Tiny: The Family Hustle
Teen Wolf on MTV
Teenage Bounty Hunters
The Game, shot in Atlanta since moving to BET for the 2011 season - as of January 2012 the highest-rated ad-supported sitcom ever on cable
The Mo'Nique Show is filmed in Atlanta
The New Atlanta - an upcoming Bravo reality series set in Atlanta
 The Real Housewives of Atlanta (series)
The Rickey Smiley Show on TV One
The Walking Dead, an AMC TV show recorded in and around Atlanta
Tyler Perry's House of Payne is filmed in Atlanta, and involves fictional firefighters working for the Atlanta Fire Department, produced by Tyler Perry Studios
Will Trent, TV series involving fictional special agents of the Georgia Bureau of Investigation and detectives of the Atlanta Police Department

Individual episodes 
Baggage Battles "Atlanta" episode, regarding trucking freight rather than the baggage of the world's busiest airport
Futurama episode "The Deep South" centers on the lost city of Atlanta, with several local references
Scooby-Doo and Guess Who? episode "Quit Clowning!" has the Scooby gang meet Kenan Thompson and confront a ghost clown.
 In addition, numerous episodes of HGTV shows are filmed in metro Atlanta.

Set but not shot in Atlanta 
Several other TV series have been set (but not necessarily shot) in Atlanta:
Cavemen  was originally to be set in Atlanta but was changed to San Diego prior to production
Designing Women
Matlock (1986-1995/1997)
Mindhunter - A couple scenes takes place in and around Atlanta
Profiler
The Royal Family

References

Culture of Atlanta
Television
Atlanta